Mickey's Revue is a 1932 Walt Disney cartoon, directed by Wilfred Jackson, which features Mickey Mouse, Minnie Mouse, Horace Horsecollar and Clarabelle Cow performing a song and dance show. The film was delivered to Columbia Pictures on May 12 and it was released on May 27, 1932. It was the 41st Mickey Mouse film, the fifth of that year, and the cartoon Goofy debuted in.
 
A yokel in the audience laughs uproariously at every act; the character would soon be known as Dippy Dawg, and would eventually become a major supporting character, Goofy. Pinto Colvig's memorable "witless laugh" could be heard in the previous Mickey Mouse cartoon, The Barnyard Olympics, but this is the first time the character can be seen on screen.

Plot
In a barnyard concert hall, Mickey Mouse is the conductor for a band of pigs and horses. In a ballet sequence, Minnie Mouse is a flying fairy, held aloft by Horace Horsecollar. Several dancing cows also feature in the performance, and Pluto makes an occasional appearance. In the audience, a witless yokel character annoys the audience by crunching a bag of peanuts and laughing loudly. A pair of tap dancing hounds perform. The yokel laughs again, and other audience members knock him out with a mallet. Mickey and Minnie round out the performance with a duet for piano and horns, assisted by a mischievous litter of kittens.

Voice cast
 Pluto: Lee Millar
 Dippy Dawg, Goats: Pinto Colvig

Home media
The short was released on December 2, 2002, on Walt Disney Treasures: Mickey Mouse in Black and White.

See also
 Mickey Mouse Revue, an attraction that operated at the Magic Kingdom from 1971 until 1980, and then at Tokyo Disneyland from 1983 until 2009
 Mickey Mouse (film series)

References

External links
 

1932 short films
1932 animated films
1932 films
1930s Disney animated short films
Films directed by Wilfred Jackson
Films produced by Walt Disney
Mickey Mouse short films
American black-and-white films
Columbia Pictures short films
Columbia Pictures animated short films